Charles-Jean-Marie Alquier (13 October 1752 – February 1826) was a French diplomat. He served as French minister in several European capitals.

Life 
Alquier was born in the village of Talmont, near Les Sables d'Olonne, in La Vendée.  He was mayor of Rochelle in 1789, and was elected by the district of Aunis to the Estates-General.  He was a member of the Constituent Assembly, and served on several committees; he became one of the secretaries of the Constituent Assembly.  When the Assembly adjourned, he became President of the Criminal Tribunal of the Department of Seine et Oise,  and was sent as their representative to the National Convention in 1792.  In that Convention, he voted for the death of King Louis XVI.  He assisted in the organization of Holland after its conquest by the French armies.  In 1795 he was appointed Secretary to the Council of Ancients, one of the organs of the Constitution of the Year III under the Directorate.

He began his diplomatic career in 1798 with the appointment as Minister Plenipotentiary to Bavaria, where he served until March, 1799, at the approach of war.  Back in France he was made Receiver-General of the Department of Seine et Oise, but on the overthrow of the Directory on the 18th of Brumaire, he returned to the diplomatic service on behalf of the new Consulate.

In March 1800, he was appointed by First Consul Bonaparte and Foreign Minister Talleyrand as Minister in Madrid.   When he was replaced in Madrid at the end of 1800 by Lucien Bonaparte, he was sent to Florence in February 1801, as Minister Plenipotentiary, to arrange peace with France. He conducted the negotiations which regularized the French conquest of Tuscany by its formal cession to France.  He moved to the Court of Naples in March and became French Minister there in April, 1801. One of his notable achievements was the dismissal of Lord Acton, the Neapolitan prime minister, in 1804. When a combined British-Russian fleet and army entered the ports of the Kingdom, Alquier left Naples. At the end of 1805 he was transferred to Rome to substitute for Cardinal Fesch, Napoleon's uncle, who had gone with Pope Pius VII to Paris. He returned to Paris in February, 1808.

In 1810–1811, he was sent to Stockholm as Envoy Extraordinary, and served as Minister in Stockholm, and in 1811–1814 in Copenhagen. His mission was to enforce the "Continental System" of Napoleon against the British and Russian commercial interests. During his tenure in Stockholm, he tried to influence the Swedish Crown Prince through his French entourage, and the favorite of the Crown Princess, Elise la Flotte was apparently his most active agent among them along with Sevret: through La Flotte, d'Alquier tried to make Désirée affect her consort, when d'Alquier met her in the company of la Flotte.

In 1813, he concluded a defensive-offensive alliance with Denmark.  With the fall of Napoleon Alquier was recalled, and with the return of the Monarchy under Louis XVIII, he was condemned to exile as a regicide.  He was allowed to return to France in 1818, with the consent of the King.  He died in Paris on February 4, 1826.

References
 Svensk uppslagsbok, Lund 1929.
 The Biographical Dictionary of the Society for the Diffusion of Useful Knowledge  Volume 2 (London 1843), p. 322.
 Alfred Boulay de la Meurthe (editor), Documents sur la négociation du Concordat et sur les autres rapports de la France avec le Saint-Siège in 1800 et 1801   Tome premier (Paris 1891), pp. 3 n.3, etc., nos. 3, 5, 170.
 Ilario Rinieri, La diplomazia pontificia nel secolo XIX   Volume I (Roma 1902), p. 76 n. 1.
 F. Schoell (editor), Archives historiques et politiques   Tome II (Paris 1819) [Alquier's negotiations with the Papacy, 1805-1808].

Notes

1752 births
1826 deaths
People from Vendée
Barons of the First French Empire
Members of the National Constituent Assembly (France)
Deputies to the French National Convention
Members of the Council of Ancients
Ambassadors of France to Sweden
Commandeurs of the Légion d'honneur
Burials at Père Lachaise Cemetery